The phonology of Italian describes the sound system—the phonology and phonetics—of Standard Italian and its geographical variants.

Consonants 

Notes:

 Between two vowels, or between a vowel and an approximant or a liquid, consonants can be both singleton or geminated. Geminated consonants shorten the preceding vowel (or block phonetic lengthening) and the first geminated element is unreleased. However,  are always geminated intervocalically. Similarly, nasals, liquids, and sibilants are pronounced slightly longer in medial consonant clusters.
  are laminal denti-alveolar , commonly called "dental" for simplicity.
  are pre-velar before .
  have two variants:
 Dentalized laminal alveolar  (commonly called "dental" for simplicity), pronounced with the blade of the tongue very close to the upper front teeth, with the tip of the tongue resting behind lower front teeth.
 Non-retracted apical alveolar . The stop component of the "apical" affricates is actually laminal denti-alveolar.
  are apical alveolar  in most environments.  are laminal denti-alveolar  before  and palatalized laminal postalveolar  before .  is velar  before .
In a large number of accents,  is a fricative .
 Intervocalically, single  is realised as a trill with one or two contacts. Some literature treats the single-contact trill as a tap . Single-contact trills can also occur elsewhere, particularly in unstressed syllables. Geminate  manifests as a trill with three to seven contacts.
The two can contrast only between vowels within a word, e.g. [ˈfuːzo] 'melted' vs. [ˈfuːso] 'spindle'. According to Canepari, though, the traditional standard has been replaced by a modern neutral pronunciation which always prefers  when intervocalic, except when the intervocalic s is the initial sound of a word, if the compound is still felt as such: for example, presento  ('I foresee', with pre meaning 'before' and sento meaning 'I perceive') vs presento  ('I present').

Vowels 

In Italian there is no phonemic distinction between long and short vowels, but vowels in stressed open syllables, unless word-final, are long at the end of the intonational phrase (including isolated words) or when emphasized. Adjacent identical vowels found at morpheme boundaries are not resyllabified, but pronounced separately ("quickly rearticulated"), and they might be reduced to a single short vowel in rapid speech.

Although Italian contrasts close-mid and open-mid vowels in stressed syllables, the distinction is neutralised in unstressed position in which only the close-mid vowels occur. The height of such vowels in unstressed position is context-sensitive; they are somewhat lowered in the vicinity of more open vowels. The distinction between close-mid and open-mid vowels is lost entirely in a few Southern varieties of Regional Italian, especially in Northern Sicily (e.g. Palermo), where they are realized as open-mid , as well as in some Northern varieties (in particular in Piedmont), where they are realized as mid .

Word-final stressed  is found in a small number of words: però, ciò, paltò. However, as a productive morpheme, it marks the first person singular of all future tense verbs (e.g. dormirò 'I will sleep') and the third person singular preterite of first conjugation verbs (parlò 's/he spoke', but credé 's/he believed', dormì 's/he slept'). Word-final unstressed  is rare,  found in onomatopoeic terms (babau), loanwords (guru), and place or family names derived from the Sardinian language (Gennargentu, Porcu).

When the last phoneme of a word is an unstressed vowel and the first phoneme of the following word is any vowel, the former vowel tends to become non-syllabic. This phenomenon is called synalepha and should be taken into account when counting syllables, e.g. in poetry.

In addition to monophthongs, Italian has diphthongs, which, however, are both phonemically and phonetically simply combinations of the other vowels. Some are very common (e.g. ), others are rarer (e.g. ) and some never occur within native Italian words (e.g. ). None of the diphthongs is, however, considered to have distinct phonemic status since their constituents do not behave differently from how they occur in isolation, unlike the diphthongs in other languages like English and German. The practice of referring to them as 'diphthongs' has been criticised by phoneticians like Luciano Canepari.

Phonotactics

Onset 
Italian allows up to three consonants in syllable-initial position, though there are limitations:

CC
E.g. spavento ('fright')
  + any voiced stop, . E.g. srotolare ('unroll')
 , or any stop + . E.g. frana ('landslide')
 , or any stop except  + . E.g. platano ('planetree')
 , or any stop or nasal + . E.g. fiume ('river'), vuole ('he/she wants'), siamo ('we are'), suono ('sound')

As an onset, the cluster  + voiceless consonant is inherently unstable. Phonetically, word-internal s+C normally syllabifies as    'toad',   (neighborhood of Rome). Phonetic syllabification of the cluster also occurs at word boundaries if a vowel precedes it without pause, e.g. 'the history', implying the same syllable break at the structural level, thus always latent due to the extrasyllabic , but unrealized phonetically unless a vowel precedes.

CCC
  + voiceless stop or  + . E.g. spregiare ('to despise')
  + voiced stop + . E.g. sbracciato ('with bare arms'), sdraiare ('to lay down'), sgravare ('to relieve')
  +  + . E.g. sclerosi ('sclerosis')
  +  + . E.g. sbloccato ('unblocked')
  or any stop +  + . E.g. priego (antiquated form of prego 'I pray'), proprio ('(one's) own' / proper / properly), pruovo (antiquated form of provo 'I try')
  or any stop or nasal +  + . E.g. quieto ('quiet'), continuiamo ('we continue')
The last combination is however rare and one of the approximants is often vocalised, e.g. quieto , continuiamo

Nucleus 
The nucleus is the only mandatory part of a syllable (for instance, a 'to, at' is a word) and must be a vowel or a diphthong. In that interpretation, Italian has only falling diphthongs (phonemically at least, cf. Synaeresis) and no triphthongs.

Coda 
Italian permits a small number of coda consonants. Outside of loanwords, the permitted consonants are:

 The first element of any geminate, e.g. tutto ('everything'), avvertire ('to warn').
 A nasal consonant that is either  (word-finally) or one that is homorganic to a following consonant. E.g. Con ('with'), un poco  ('a little'), ampio ('ample').
E.g. per ('for'), alto ('high').
  (though not before fricatives). E.g. pesca ('peach'); but asfalto ('asphalt').

There are also restrictions in the types of syllables that permit consonants in the syllable coda.  explains that neither geminates, nor coda consonants with "rising sonority" can follow falling diphthongs. However, "rising diphthongs" (or sequences of an approximant and a following vowel) may precede clusters with falling sonority, particularly those that stem historically from an obstruent+liquid onset. For example:

 biondo ('blond')
 chiosco ('kiosk')
 chiostro ('cloister')
 chioccia ('broody hen')
 fianco ('hip')

Syntactic gemination 

Word-initial consonants are geminated after certain vowel-final words in the same prosodic unit. There are two types of triggers of initial gemination: some unstressed particles, prepositions, and other monosyllabic words, and any oxytonic polysyllabic word. As an example of the first type, casa ('house') is pronounced  but a casa ('homeward') is pronounced . This is not a purely phonological process, as no gemination is cued by the la in la casa 'the house' , and there is nothing detectable in the structure of the preposition a to account for the gemination. Gemination cued by final stressed vowels, however, is transparently phonological. Final stressed vowels are short by nature, if a consonant follows a short stressed vowel the syllable must be closed, thus the consonant following the final stressed vowel is drawn to lengthen: parlò portoghese  's/he spoke Portuguese' vs. parla portoghese  's/he speaks Portuguese'.

To summarize, syntactic gemination occurs in standard Italian mainly in the following two cases:

 After word-final stressed vowels (words such as sanità, perché, poté, morì and so on).
 After the words a, che, chi, come, da, do, dove, e, fa, fra, fu, gru, ha, ho, ma, me, mo'  (in the phrase a mo' di), no, o, qua, qualche, qui, so, sopra, sta, sto, su, te, tra, tre, tu, va, vo.

Syntactic gemination is the normal native pronunciation in Central Italy (both "stress-induced" and "lexical") and Southern Italy (only "lexical"), including Sicily and Corsica (France).

In Northern Italy and Sardinia, speakers use it inconsistently because the feature is not present in the dialectal substratum and is not usually shown in the written language unless a new word is produced by the fusion of the two: "chi sa"-> chissà ("who knows" in the sense of goodness knows).

Regional variation 

The above IPA symbols and description refer to standard Italian, based on a somewhat idealized version of the Tuscan-derived national language. As is common in many cultures, this single version of the language was pushed as neutral, proper, and eventually superior, leading to some stigmatization of varying accents. Television news anchors and other high-profile figures had to put aside their regional Italian when in the public sphere. However, in more recent years the enforcement of this standard has fallen out of favor in Italy, and news reporters, actors, and the like are now more free to deliver their words in their native regional variety of Italian, which appeals to the Italian population's range of linguistic diversity. The variety is still not represented in its wholeness and accents from the South are maybe to be considered less popular, except in shows set in the South and in comedy, a field in which Naples, Sicily and the South in general have always been present. Though it still represents the basics for the standard variety, the loosened restrictions have led to Tuscan being seen for what it is, just one dialect among many with its own regional peculiarities and qualities, many of which are shared with Umbria, Southern Marche and Northern Lazio.

 In Tuscany (though not in standard Italian, which is derived from, but not equivalent to, Tuscan dialect), voiceless stops are typically pronounced as fricatives between vowels. That is,  → : e.g. i capitani 'the captains' , a phenomenon known as the gorgia toscana 'Tuscan throat'. This deaffrication can result in minimal pairs distinguished only by length of the fricatives, [ʃ] issuing from /t͡ʃ/ and [ʃː] from geminate /ʃʃ/:  lacerò 's/he ripped' vs.  lascerò 'I will leave'.
 In nonstandard varieties of Central and Southern Italian, some stops at the end of a syllable completely assimilate to the following consonant. Similarly, although the cluster  has developed historically as  through assimilation, a learned word such as ictus will be pronounced  by some,  by others.
 In popular (non-Tuscan) Central and Southern Italian speech,  and  tend to always be geminated ( and ) when between two vowels, or a vowel and a sonorant (or ). Sometimes this is also used in written language, e.g. writing robba instead of roba ('property'), to suggest a regional accent, though this spelling is considered incorrect.
A notable example is the word casa ('house'): in Northern Italy it is pronounced ; in Southern-Central Italy it's pronounced .
 In several Southern varieties, voiceless stops tend to be voiced if following a sonorant, as an influence of the still largely spoken regional languages: campo  is often pronounced , and Antonio  is frequently .

The various Tuscan, Corsican and Central Italian dialects are, to some extent, the closest ones to Standard Italian in terms of linguistic features, since the latter is based on a somewhat polished form of Florentine.

Phonological development 

Very little research has been done on the earliest stages of phonological development in Italian. This article primarily describes phonological development after the first year of life. See the main article on phonological development for a description of first year stages. Many of the earliest stages are thought to be universal to all infants.

Phoneme inventory 
Word-final consonants are rarely produced during the early stages of word production. Consonants are usually found in word-initial position, or in intervocalic position.

17 months 
A preference for a front place of articulation is present.

21 months 
More phones now appear in intervocalic contexts. The additions to the phonetic inventory are the voiced stop , the nasal , the voiceless affricate , and the liquid .

24 months 

27 months 
Approximately equal numbers of phones are now produced in word-initial and intervocalic position. Additions to the phonetic inventory are the voiced stop  and the consonant cluster .

Stops are the most common manner of articulation at all stages and are produced more often than they are present in the target words at around 18 months. Gradually this frequency decreases to almost target-like frequency by around 27 months. The opposite process happens with fricatives, affricates, laterals and trills. Initially, the production of these phonemes is significantly less than what is found in the target words and the production continues to increases to target-like frequency. Alveolars and bilabials are the two most common places of articulation, with alveolar production steadily increasing after the first stage and bilabial production gently decreasing. Labiodental and postalveolar production increases throughout development, while velar production decreases.

Phonotactics 


Syllable structures

6–10 months 
Babbling becomes distinct from previous, less structured vocal play. Initially, syllable structure is limited to CVCV, called reduplicated babbling. At this stage, children’s vocalizations have a weak relation to adult Italian and the Italian lexicon.

11–14 months 
The most-used syllable type changes as children age, and the distribution of syllables takes on increasingly Italian characteristics. This ability significantly increases between the ages of 11 and 12 months, 12 and 13 months, and 13 and 14 months. Consonant clusters are still absent. Children's first ten words appear around month 12, and take CVCV format (e.g. mamma 'mom', papà 'dad').

18–24 months 
Reduplicated babbling is replaced by variegated babbling, producing syllable structures such as C1VC2V (e.g. cane 'dog', topo 'mouse'). Production of trisyllabic words begins (e.g. pecora 'sheep', matita 'pencil'). Consonant clusters are now present (e.g. bimba 'female child', venti 'twenty'). Ambient language plays an increasingly significant role as children begin to solidify early syllable structure. Syllable combinations that are infrequent in the Italian lexicon, such as velar-labial sequences (e.g. capra 'goat' or gamba 'leg') are infrequently produced correctly by children, and are often subject to consonant harmony.

Stress patterns 
In Italian, stress is lexical, meaning it is word-specific and partly unpredictable. Penultimate stress (primary stress on the second-to-last syllable) is also generally preferred. This goal, acting simultaneously with the child's initial inability to produce polysyllabic words, often results in weak-syllable deletion. The primary environment for weak-syllable deletion in polysyllabic words is word-initial, as deleting word-final or word-medial syllables would interfere with the penultimate stress pattern heard in ambient language.

Phonological awareness 
Children develop syllabic segmentation awareness earlier than phonemic segmentation awareness. In earlier stages, syllables are perceived as a separate phonetic unit, while phonemes are perceived as assimilated units by coarticulation in spoken language. By first grade, Italian children are nearing full development of segmentation awareness on both syllables and phonemes. Compared to those children whose mother tongue exhibits closed syllable structure (CVC,CCVC, CVCC, etc.), Italian-speaking children develop this segmentation awareness earlier, possibly due to its open syllable structure (CVCV, CVCVCV, etc.). Rigidity in Italian (shallow orthography and open syllable structure) makes it easier for Italian-speaking children to be aware of those segments.

Sample texts 

Provided here is a rendition of the Bible, Luke 2, 1–7, as read by a native Italian speaker from Milan. As a northerner, his pronunciation lacks syntactic doubling ( instead of ) and intervocalic  ( instead of ).

2:1 In quei giorni, un decreto di Cesare Augusto ordinava che si facesse un censimento di tutta la terra.2 Questo primo censimento fu fatto quando Quirino era governatore della Siria. 3 Tutti andavano a farsi registrare, ciascuno nella propria città. 4 Anche Giuseppe, che era della casa e della famiglia di Davide, dalla città di Nazaret e dalla Galilea si recò in Giudea nella città di Davide, chiamata Betlemme, 5 per farsi registrare insieme a Maria, sua sposa, che era incinta. 6 Proprio mentre si trovavano lì, venne il tempo per lei di partorire. 7 Mise al mondo il suo primogenito, lo avvolse in fasce e lo depose in una mangiatoia, poiché non c'era posto per loro nella locanda.

A rough transcription of the audio sample is:

2:1 2 3 4  5 6 7 

The Standard Italian pronunciation of the text is:

2:1 2 3 4  5 6 7

See also 
 Italian orthography
 Italian language
 Italian grammar
 Syntactic gemination
 Wikipedia help page for IPA for Italian – includes English approximations
 Italian pronunciation guide at Wiktionary

References

Bibliography

External links 
 The online edition (2016) of the Dizionario d'ortografia e di pronunzia (DOP), a pronouncing dictionary of standard Italian

Italian language
Italic phonologies